Dineutus angustus is a species of whirligig beetles in the family Gyrinidae. It is found in North America.

References

 Arnett, R.H. Jr., ed. (1983). "Family 10: Gyrinidae, The Whirligig Beetles". Checklist of the Beetles of North and Central America and the West Indies, 1–4.
 Gustafson, Grey T., and Kelly B. Miller (2015). "The New World whirligig beetles of the genus Dineutus Macleay, 1825 (Coleoptera, Gyrinidae, Gyrininae, Dineutini)". ZooKeys, no. 476, 1–135.

Further reading

 Arnett, R. H. Jr., and M. C. Thomas. (eds.). (21 December 2000) American Beetles, Volume I: Archostemata, Myxophaga, Adephaga, Polyphaga: Staphyliniformia. CRC Press LLC, Boca Raton, Florida. 
 
 Richard E. White. (1983). Peterson Field Guides: Beetles. Houghton Mifflin Company.

Gyrinidae
Beetles described in 1878